For the Love of Dolly is a 2006 documentary film directed by Tai Uhlmann. It focuses on five colorful Dolly Parton fans and explores their fascination with the singer. The film made its debut at the 2006 Miami Film Festival.

Synopsis
This documentary was filmed over the course of a year and shows five of Dolly's most avid fans as they follow her career. Dolly Parton's upbeat attitude, sense of humor and great talent allow her to inspire fans across the country. The film is made up of interviews, footage of daily life, trips to Dolly concerts and pilgrimages to Dollywood, the Dolly Parton theme park. The film documents the ways that Dolly's fans exhibit not only their adoration for Dolly, but also their need to be close to her, literally following her career as they travel to as many venues where she makes appearances as possible. For the Love of Dolly shows that fandom can give meaning to some people's lives, but it can also overwhelm the lives of others.

Cast
Harrell Gabehart as himself
Judy Ogle as herself
Patric Parkey as himself
Dolly Parton as herself
Jeannette Williams as herself
Melisa Rastellini as herself
David Schmidli as himself

References

External links
Internet Movie Database

Documentary films about fandom
2006 films
2006 documentary films
American documentary films
Dolly Parton
2000s American films